Progress in Retinal and Eye Research is a bimonthly peer-reviewed medical journal covering all aspects of ophthalmology. It was established in 1994 by Elsevier.

Abstracting and indexing
The journal  is abstracted and indexed in the Science Citation Index Expanded and Scopus. According to the Journal Citation Reports, the journal has a 2021 impact factor of 19.704.

References

External links

English-language journals
Elsevier academic journals
Publications established in 1994
Ophthalmology journals
Bimonthly journals